The University of Wisconsin–Oshkosh, Fond du Lac Campus (UWO Fond du Lac) is a two-year campus of the University of Wisconsin System located in Fond du Lac, Wisconsin, United States. The college is a satellite campus of the University of Wisconsin–Oshkosh.

UW–Fond du Lac is one of 13 freshman-sophomore liberal arts transfer campuses of the UW Colleges and offers a general education associate degree. After beginning their studies at UWO Fond du Lac, students transfer to other UW System institutions as well as to colleges and universities throughout the country to complete their bachelor's degrees. The college offers seven bachelor's degree programs from five four-year state colleges which can be completed on campus.

The campus features a  lake surrounded by six buildings. A  Gottfried Arboretum is under development and will serve as an outdoor classroom and provide recreational opportunities.

History
The beginnings of the campus are rooted in the 1950s when the University of Wisconsin–Madison operated an extension campus in Fond du Lac. By the beginning of the 1960s, however, that venture had ended, and local community organizers were hoping to bring a fully operating campus to the community. Setting up a joint commission between the city and county, they successfully lobbied for the building of a campus and set aside land in 1966, the previous home of the county airport on the city of Fond du Lac's east side.

The campus opened as a satellite campus of UW–Oshkosh on September 9, 1968, and became an independent two-year campus in 1972.

The addition of a student commons, 300-seat Prairie Theater, and renovation of the original buildings was completed in the fall of 2000.

In July 2018, the University of Wisconsin Colleges system restructured, and UW–Fond du Lac once again became a satellite campus of UW–Oshkosh.

Alumni
Notable alumni include:

Terri McCormick, state representative and candidate for the U.S. House of Representatives

References

External links
UWO Fond du Lac official website

University of Wisconsin–Oshkosh, Fond du Lac Campus
Education in Fond du Lac County, Wisconsin
Educational institutions established in 1968
Fond du Lac
Buildings and structures in Fond du Lac County, Wisconsin
1968 establishments in Wisconsin
Fond du Lac, Wisconsin
Two-year colleges in the United States
Fond du Lac